There's a Wocket in My Pocket is a short children's book by Dr. Seuss, published by Random House in 1974.

In popular culture
In 2018, rapper Win Nevaluze rapped the words of There's A Wocket In My Pocket to the beat of the Migos song "Walk It Talk It", causing it to become an internet hit.

References

Books by Dr. Seuss
1974 children's books
American picture books
Viral videos
Internet memes introduced in 2018
Random House books